Plesiolebias is a genus of fish in the family Rivulidae. These annual killifish are endemic to seasonal pools, swamps and lagoons in the Araguaia–Tocantins, Xingu, and uppermost Paraguay (Pantanal) river basins in Brazil.

As typical of killifish, males are more colorful than females.

Species
Plesiolebias and the closely related Maratecoara, Papiliolebias, Pituna and Stenolebias form a clade, Plesiolebiasini.

There are currently eight recognized species in Plesiolebias:

 Plesiolebias altamira W. J. E. M. Costa & D. T. B. Nielsen, 2007
 Plesiolebias aruana (Lazara, 1991)
 Plesiolebias canabravensis W. J. E. M. Costa & D. T. B. Nielsen, 2007
 Plesiolebias filamentosus W. J. E. M. Costa & G. C. Brasil, 2007
 Plesiolebias fragilis W. J. E. M. Costa, 2007
 Plesiolebias glaucopterus (W. J. E. M. Costa & Lacerda, 1989)
 Plesiolebias lacerdai W. J. E. M. Costa, 1989
 Plesiolebias xavantei (W. J. E. M. Costa, Lacerda & Tanizaki, 1988)

References

Rivulidae
Freshwater fish genera